Ralph Arthur "Doc" Carroll (December 28, 1891 – June 27, 1983), was a Major League Baseball catcher who played in  with the Philadelphia Athletics. He batted and threw right-handed. Carroll had a .091 batting average in ten games, two hits in 22 at-bats, in his one-year career. Carroll graduated from Worcester Academy.

Carroll played college baseball for Holy Cross and Tufts before coaching at Worcester Polytechnic Institute.

He was born and died in Worcester, Massachusetts.

References

External links

1891 births
1983 deaths
American dentists
Baseball players from Worcester, Massachusetts
Holy Cross Crusaders baseball players
Major League Baseball catchers
Milwaukee Braves scouts
Philadelphia Athletics players
Tufts Jumbos baseball players
Worcester Academy alumni
WPI Engineers baseball coaches